Darden Hotel, also known as Conoho House and Hamilton House, is a historic hotel building located at Hamilton, Martin County, North Carolina.  It was built about 1843, and is a two-story, three bay by four bay, temple form frame building in the Greek Revival style.  It features a superimposed vernacular Ionic order double portico.

It was listed on the National Register of Historic Places in 1975.

References

Hotel buildings on the National Register of Historic Places in North Carolina
Greek Revival architecture in North Carolina
Hotel buildings completed in 1843
Buildings and structures in Martin County, North Carolina
National Register of Historic Places in Martin County, North Carolina
1843 establishments in North Carolina